Robert Weiner or Robert Wiener may refer to:

Robert Weiner
Robert S. Weiner (born 1947), American Democratic strategist and political commentator
Robert Weiner Jr. (born 1982), American international water polo player
Robert Weiner (American football), American high school and college football coach
Jacob Weiner (born Robert Milton Weiner, born 1947), American plant ecologist

Robert Wiener
Robert Wiener (1908–2019), Canadian physician and supercentenarian
Robert Wiener (producer), CNN producer and author of Live from Baghdad

See also
Weiner
Weiner (disambiguation)
Wiener (disambiguation)